César de Matos Rodrigues (born Campo de Besteiros, Viseu, 22 February 1902, date of death unknown) was a Portuguese footballer who played midfielder for Belenenses and the Portugal national team.

International career 

Matos had 17 caps for Portugal. Matos made his debut for the national team at 17 May 1925 against Spain in a 0–2 defeat in Lisbon. He participated in the 1928 Football Olympic Tournament and played in all 3 games for Portugal. His last game was at 2 April 1933, in a 0–3 defeat to Spain, in Vigo, aged 31 years old.

References

External links 
 
 
 

1902 births
C.F. Os Belenenses players
Portugal international footballers
Portuguese footballers
Olympic footballers of Portugal
Footballers at the 1928 Summer Olympics
Year of death missing
Association football midfielders
People from Viseu
Sportspeople from Viseu District